Khangsar  is a village development committee in Manang District in the Gandaki Zone of northern Nepal. At the time of the 2011 Nepal census it had a population of 257 people in 58 individual households.

Khangsar village is located in north central Nepal 3756 meters above sea level. There are more than 300 inhabitants.

References

Populated places in Manang District, Nepal